Killarney is a parliamentary constituency represented in the House of Assembly of the Bahamas created in 2007. It elects one Member of Parliament (MP) using a First past the post electoral system. The seat has been held by the Free National Movement and has had Hubert Minnis as its MP since its creation.

Boundaries
The constituency covers northwestern New Providence Island, starting at Cable Beach and encompassing the West End and Lake Killarney. It is one of the largest constituencies, which has garnered calls to have its boundaries altered.

Members of Parliament

Electoral history

References

Constituencies established in 2007
Constituencies of the Bahamas